Carrie is a musical with a book by Lawrence D. Cohen, lyrics by Dean Pitchford, and music by Michael Gore. Adapted from Stephen King's 1974 novel Carrie, it focuses on an awkward teenage girl with telekinetic powers whose lonely life is dominated by an oppressive religious fanatic mother. When she is humiliated by her classmates at the high school prom, she unleashes chaos on everyone and everything in her path.

Originally premiering in the U.K. in 1988, Carrie opened on Broadway at the Virginia Theatre the same year, but closed after 16 previews and five regular performances. Due to the passionate response from both its critics and its fans, the show is considered one of the most notable failures in Broadway theatre history; a 1991 book written by Ken Mandelbaum, which chronicled the history of flop Broadway musicals, was partially entitled Not Since Carrie, and a 2021 podcast, Out for Blood, documented its creation and development.

Production history
Inspired by a 1981 performance of Alban Berg's opera Lulu at the Metropolitan Opera House, Lawrence D. Cohen, who wrote the script for the 1976 film version of Carrie, and Michael Gore began work on a musical based on the Stephen King novel. Gore's Fame  collaborator, Dean Pitchford, was brought in to work on the project, which underwent numerous rewrites. In August 1984, a workshop of the first act was staged at 890 Broadway in New York City, with Annie Golden as Carrie, Maureen McGovern as Mrs. White, Laurie Beechman as Mrs. Gardner, and Liz Callaway as Chris. It was soon announced that Carrie would be produced on Broadway in 1986. Funding was not raised until late 1987.

Early productions

Stratford try-out
The show was produced by Friedrich Kurz and the Royal Shakespeare Company and had its first four-week run beginning on February 13, 1988 in Stratford-upon-Avon, England, where it received mixed reviews. Directed by Terry Hands and choreographed by Debbie Allen, the cast included Broadway veteran and cabaret singer Barbara Cook, Charlotte d'Amboise, Gene Anthony Ray, Darlene Love, and Linzi Hateley, in her stage debut, as Carrie. The massive, technically complex production, which was made with the help of designer Ralph Koltai, featured pyrotechnics, lasers, automated scenery, and a gigantic white staircase that would lower from the ceiling for the final scene of the show (with a completely automated lighting rig underneath, which would lower for the final scene to make room for the staircase).

The production was plagued with script and technical problems.  The crew was unable to douse Hateley with fake blood without causing her microphone to malfunction. Rewrites continued following each show, and the program cited a song, "Once I Loved a Boy", which had been rewritten and retitled "When There's No One" prior to the first performance. Cook resigned when she was nearly decapitated by an elaborate set piece — the Whites' Living Room, during "Open Your Heart" — on opening night, but she agreed to stay on until a replacement could be cast, which turned out to be the remainder of the show's Stratford run. A musical section of the "Locker Room Scene" (which has come to be known as "Her Mother Should Have Told Her") was removed during the run, then re-added and dropped partway through the Broadway previews. Another song, "White Star", was excised after the Stratford run.

1988 Broadway production
The show transferred to Broadway at an expense of $8 million (at the time an exorbitant amount). Hateley (who ultimately won a Theatre World Award) and other members of the UK cast remained with the show, but Cook was replaced by Betty Buckley (who had played the teacher Miss Collins in the 1976 film version).

The show started previews on April 28 at the Virginia Theatre. After the final song, boos were heard mixed in with applause. Ken Mandelbaum is quoted by Wollman, MacDermot, and Trask: "Ken Mandelbaum writes of an audience divided during early previews, the curtain calls of which were greeted with a raucous mix of cheers and boos.  However, in an instant, when Linzi Hateley and Betty Buckley rose to take their bows, the entire theatre turned to a standing ovation". According to The New York Times, "the show had received standing ovations at some previews, as well as on opening night..."

The show officially opened on May 12. Hampered by mostly negative reviews, and despite the fact that the theatre was sold out every night, the financial backers pulled their money out of the show, and it closed on May 15 after only 16 previews and 5 performances, guaranteeing its place in Broadway history as one of the most expensive disasters ever. According to The New York Times, the "more-than-$7 million show...was the most expensive quick flop in Broadway history".

2012 Off-Broadway revival
A reading was held on November 20, 2009, in New York City. The score and book were revised by original composers Michael Gore and Dean Pitchford, and writer Lawrence D. Cohen. The songs "Dream On", "It Hurts to Be Strong", "Don't Waste the Moon", "Heaven", "I'm Not Alone", "Wotta Night" and "Out for Blood" were removed and replaced with new songs. The reading was directed by Stafford Arima and starred Sutton Foster, Marin Mazzie and Molly Ranson.

In October 2010, Carrie was confirmed to be produced Off-Broadway at the Lucille Lortel Theatre by MCC Theater. The director is Stafford Arima with the original creators working on revisions of the show. From May 25 through June 7, a developmental lab was held at MCC, directed by Arima and choreographed by Matt Williams. The initial cast for the revival was announced in May 2011. From the reading held in 2009, Marin Mazzie starred as Margaret White and Molly Ranson as Carrie. Additional cast was announced on November 21. On August 1, a benefit preview of the revival was presented at the Lucille Lortel Theatre. Titled "Revisiting Carrie", the event gave a behind-the-scenes look at the upcoming production with Cohen, Gore and Pitchford. Arima was also present as well. Throughout the evening, Mazzie, Ranson and other cast members, performed song selections from the show.

2015 Off-West End production
In early 2015, Paul Taylor-Mills (producer) and Gary Lloyd (director) announced that they were bringing the revamped Carrie to London's Off-West End theatre, the Southwark Playhouse running for a limited season from 1 to 30 May. Casting for this production included Evelyn Hoskins in the title role, Kim Criswell as Margaret White, Sarah McNicholas as Sue Snell, Gabriella Williams as Chris Hargensen, Jodie Jacobs as Miss Gardner, Greg Miller-Burns as Tommy Ross and Dex Lee as Billy Nolan. The production opened to mostly positive reviews, mostly congratulating Hoskins on her performance as Carrie and Criswell as her terrifying mother.

2015 Los Angeles production 
On March 18, a new environmental-immersive version of Carrie received its Los Angeles premiere at the La Mirada Theatre for the Performing Arts. Directed by Brady Schwind and Choreographed by Lee Martino, the cast for the Los Angeles premiere included Emily Lopez as Carrie White, Misty Cotton as Margaret White, Kayla Parker as Sue Snell, Jon Robert Hall as Tommy Ross, Valerie Rose Curiel as Chris Hargensen, Garrett Marshall as Billy Nolan and Jenelle Lynn Randall as Miss Gardner. The production also featured Tiana Okoye as an alternate for Carrie. She is the first African-American actress to play the part in a mainstream production.

The immersive production, featuring a further revised book and score, and renamed Carrie the Killer Musical Experience, received largely positive reviews, especially for its cast and unique staging concept. Producers Jack W. Batman and Bruce Robert Harris planned a future productions of the staging for additional cities nationwide and internationally. The La Mirada production of Carrie received five Ovation Award nominations from the L.A. Stage Alliance: Best Production of a Musical, Best Actress: Emily Lopez, Best Actress: Misty Cotton, Best Director: Brady Schwind and Best Scenic Design: Stephen Gifford.

The immersive production of Carrie would return to Los Angeles in October for a limited six-week engagement. The show began performances at the historic Los Angeles Theatre in Downtown Los Angeles on October 1 in advance of an October 8 opening. The majority of the La Mirada cast returned, including all leading and supporting actors.

Legacy
The Broadway show was a flop and even inspired the title of Ken Mandelbaum's 1992 book Not Since Carrie: Forty Years of Broadway Musical Flops. However, it eventually grew in popularity.

Following the original production, there were three unauthorized productions at Stagedoor Manor, Emerson College and at Gammel Hellerup Gymnasium in Copenhagen, Denmark in 2001.

Although there is no official cast recording of the original 1988 production, several bootleg audio tapes were surreptitiously made during live performances in both Stratford and New York, along with video footage shot from the audience, in addition to the professionally made review tape sent to various journalists to promote the show. These recordings began to circulate soon after the show closed, and it was rumored in the early 1990s that there were plans to record an official cast album, though it never happened. However, a cast album of the 2012 Off-Broadway revival was released on September 25.

Carrie received its first licensed US high school production at Albuquerque, Sandia Preparatory School in New Mexico in February 2013. Following this, it received its licensed US collegiate premiere with Macabre Theatre Ensemble in Ithaca, NY in March 2013 directed by Sean Pollock.

Buckley recorded the song "When There's No One" for her 1993 album Children Will Listen (the song also appeared on her 1999 album Betty Buckley's Broadway), and Hateley released the title song on her album Sooner Or Later. In 1999, "Unsuspecting Hearts" was recorded by Emily Skinner and Alice Ripley and released on their album of the same name.

Early in the 21st century, playwright Erik Jackson attempted to secure the rights to stage another production of the musical, but his request was denied. Jackson eventually earned the consent of Stephen King to mount a new, officially sanctioned, non-musical production of Carrie, which debuted Off-Broadway in 2006 with drag queen Sherry Vine in the lead role.

Similarly, other unofficial spoofs have been staged over the years, most notably Scarrie! The Musical, Carrie White the Musical and Carrie's Facts of Life, which was a hybrid of Carrie and the American sitcom The Facts of Life.

In 2018, a high school production of the musical is the focus of "Chapter Thirty-One: A Night to Remember" episode of Riverdale. The Riverdale cast album of the musical was produced via WaterTower Music.

Plot

1988 production

Act I

Opening in a high school gym, the gym teacher, Miss Gardner, is leading her girls' gym class in a strenuous workout ("In"). After class, the girls head to the locker room and have fun teasing a less attractive, plump girl named Carrie White.

The girls start to shower while talking about boys and their plans for the upcoming prom ("Dream On"). Carrie has her first period in the shower and, not understanding what is happening, thinks she is bleeding to death. The other girls taunt her mercilessly until Miss Gardner hears the commotion, and slaps Carrie to end the frenzy, causing her to break a lightbulb overhead with telekinesis. The girls look on with amazed curiosity and pitiful disregard. Miss Gardner sends the girls away, and explains menstruation to Carrie.

On the way out of the gym, Sue and Chris talk about what just happened in the locker room. Sue is already feeling remorseful for her part in the incident, but Chris calls Carrie "Scary White". Carrie is hurt by their name-calling and teasing, but dreams of being vindicated and gaining respect from her peers ("Carrie").

Carrie's mother Margaret is praying ("Open Your Heart") when Carrie arrives home. Carrie joins her mother in prayer for a few minutes and then explains what happened in the locker room. Margaret tells Carrie in a twisted display of her corrupted religious psyche that the blood is a sign of her sin, and the materialization of her mysterious power ("And Eve Was Weak") and forces her into the cellar to pray for forgiveness.

That night, many of the high school students are at the drive-in theater, including Sue and her boyfriend Tommy and Chris and her boyfriend Billy. Sue tells Tommy that she is still upset about what she and the other girls did to Carrie in the locker room, while Chris complains about Carrie to Billy ("Don't Waste the Moon"). While the other teenagers are at the drive-in, Carrie and Margaret are home praying ("Evening Prayers"). Margaret prays for the strength to help her daughter while Carrie, depressed, questions God's love for her. Margaret apologizes for hurting Carrie and assures her that she loves her unconditionally.

At school the following day, Miss Gardner tells the girls they must all apologize to Carrie. Sue and the other girls comply, but Chris refuses. Upset, Miss Gardner tells Chris that she will not be allowed to go to the prom, and Chris vows revenge. Miss Gardner encourages Carrie to dream about her Prince Charming ("Unsuspecting Hearts").

Still upset over the way Carrie has been treated, Sue asks Tommy to take Carrie to the prom instead of her ("Do Me a Favor"), and he reluctantly agrees. At the same time, Chris asks Billy to help her get revenge on Carrie.

Tommy surprises Carrie by knocking on her door and asking her to go to prom. Though at first confused and uneasy, Carrie eventually agrees to go with him. When she tells her mother the news ("Invited"), Margaret forbids her to go, insisting that all boys just want to take advantage of girls, including her own father ("I Remember How Those Boys Could Dance"), and the prom would be an occasion of sin. Carrie reveals her supernatural powers, telling her mother that she is determined to attend the prom and will not be stopped.

Act II

The act opens at a pig farm while a storm rages, where Chris, Billy, and several of his friends are on a mission to collect the blood of a pig for the prom night revenge. Billy warns Chris to look inside herself and consider the consequences ("Out for Blood"). Back at the high school, preparations are underway for prom night. Sue is confronted by girls who are upset that Carrie is going to the prom. Sue, having been abandoned by her friends, steps into Carrie’s shoes. She believes she is doing the right thing but realizes that doing the right thing is not always easy ("It Hurts to be Strong").

Getting ready for the prom, Carrie dreams about her date and, in a positive display of her special powers, she sends her dress, shoes, and hairbrush dancing through the air ("I'm Not Alone"). Margaret tries one more time to convince Carrie not to go to the prom ("Carrie (Reprise)"), but Carrie doesn't listen. She leaves for the prom with Tommy. Alone, Margaret laments her past and plans to save Carrie from damnation the only way she can ("When There's No One").

Tommy and Carrie arrive at the prom ("Wotta Night") and everyone is surprised at how beautiful Carrie is and begin to slowly accept her. Miss Gardner is there as a chaperone and talks to Carrie about how it feels to be in love ("Unsuspecting Hearts (Reprise)"). Carrie is nervous about dancing with Tommy, but he finally convinces her to go out on the dance floor with him ("Heaven"). As the votes for prom king and queen are cast, Tommy, Carrie, Sue, Chris, Billy, Margaret, and Miss Gardner soliloquize about the events unfolding in a spectacular full cast septet ("Heaven (Reprise)"). At the height of the nights rapture, Tommy and Carrie are declared king and queen of the prom, and they are crowned as the students applaud and sing the "Alma Mater".

Suddenly, Billy and Chris appear and dump a bucket of pig blood on Carrie. In a flash, the night's joy is turned into horror. Carrie, humiliated and incensed, realizes in fiery rage her full powers. She closes off the gym exit, sparing a horrified Sue, and kills everyone present ("The Destruction"). After this, Carrie exits the prom where she is met by her mother on the steps of the school. Margaret lures Carrie in and sings her to sleep ("Carrie (Lullaby)"). But in a final display of her corruption and confused love, Margaret stabs her fatally, believing her daughter will be saved from God's wrath. Carrie retaliates, killing Margaret with her powers, expressing immediate remorse as her mother dies. Sue, the sole survivor and only witness to this final scene, goes to Carrie and comforts her as she dies. As the show comes to a spellbinding conclusion, Carrie reaches her hand out to the audience, as the lights fade to black.

2012 production

Act I

Sue Snell, haunted witness and tour guide to our story, struggles to recount the incidents leading up to the tragic night of May 28. As she's questioned about the past, figures from her life in high school appear. Whatever their differences – be they good girl Sue, her varsity-athlete boyfriend Tommy Ross, her spoiled-rotten best friend Chris Hargensen, Chris' trouble-maker boyfriend Billy Nolan, or perennial misfit Carrie White – they are all wrestling with the same insecurities and united in their desire to belong ("In").

After gym class, Carrie experiences her first period in the shower. Her terrified screams for help and seeming ignorance about what's happening to her amuse and inflame the girls. With Chris as ringleader, Sue and the others encircle Carrie, gleefully chanting names and savagely taunting her. As gym teacher Miss Gardner races in at the height of Carrie's hysteria, an overhead light bulb inexplicably explodes. When the girls are reprimanded, they dismissively rationalize, "It's just Carrie", the butt of their jokes since childhood.

Miss Gardner and guidance counselor/English teacher Mr. Stephens send Carrie home for the rest of the day. But even as she leaves, her classmates' hurtful insults and name-calling ricochet in Carrie's mind until she cracks in fury ("Carrie"). Tommy and his pals discuss the upcoming senior prom as Billy roars in on his skateboard, clowning around. Carrie passes by and he jeeringly ridicules her. When she turns a furious glance in his direction, he goes sprawling. Angry and embarrassed, Billy tries to blame his seeming clumsiness on Carrie, but the other guys just laugh.

At the White bungalow, Carrie's mother Margaret works at her sewing machine and sings along to her favorite evangelical radio program ("Open Your Heart"). When the still-troubled Carrie arrives home, she reluctantly joins in the hymn. Carrie summons the courage to tell her mother about the day's traumatic event. The realization that her child is now a woman throws Margaret into a God-fearing panic. When Carrie resists, Margaret locks her in a closet to beg for repentance ("And Eve Was Weak").

With her parents out of town, Chris throws a party at which she recounts to the kids the details of that day's incident with Carrie in the locker room. When Sue – confused and upset about her role in the hazing – protests that it wasn't funny, Chris perversely instructs her in the natural order of things ("The World According to Chris"). Upset by Chris' toxic message, Sue turns her back on her best friend and leaves with Tommy.

Back at the White household, Carrie is still locked in her prayer closet surrounded by religious icons. Margaret, meanwhile, pleads for her own divine guidance. As Carrie puzzles over this new sensation she's been feeling, she grows more agitated. Suddenly, a little figurine of Jesus levitates, leaving Carrie to wonder if this strange power might possibly be coming from within her. Margaret releases her from the closet and tearfully apologizes for her actions, prompting Carrie to beg for forgiveness as well. The two find solace in each other's goodnight embrace ("Evening Prayers").

In English class, Mr. Stephens praises a poem Tommy has written, and has him recite his work ("Dreamer in Disguise"). When the teacher asks the unruly students for reactions, Carrie volunteers. Her heartfelt emotion only provokes the other kids' mockery. After class, Sue acts on Tommy's advice and tries to apologize to Carrie but, thinking it's some kind of trick, Carrie explodes at her and storms off. Shaken and shocked into awareness, Sue muses on their encounter ("Once You See"). Miss Gardner rebukes the girls for their reckless mistreatment of Carrie and demands that they apologize to her – or else they will be sent to detention for one week. They all do, except for Chris, who instead hurls a vicious invective at Carrie, causing Miss Gardner to change Chris's charge from detention to suspension, thus kicking her out of the prom. Frantic, Chris tries to rally the girls to join her in defying their teacher until Sue shouts at Chris to shut up and that everything does not revolve around her. Battle lines are drawn as the best friends are now enemies. When Miss Gardner apologizes to the sobbing Carrie for what just happened, Carrie surprises her by insisting that she's got to let Chris go to Prom. Carrie points out that for girls like Chris, Prom is like a dream. When pressed, Carrie admits that she herself is not going. Moved by Carrie's lack of self-esteem and her need for support, Miss Gardner assures her that things can change ("Unsuspecting Hearts").

Determined to do right by Carrie, Sue asks Tommy for help with a plan she's devised. Similarly, Chris, blaming Carrie for her humiliation, interrupts a make-out session with Billy to get his help in her plot for revenge ("Do Me A Favor"). Alone in the library, Carrie reads about telekinesis from a book. Concentrating intensely, she succeeds in moving chairs across the room without touching them, startling herself with this newfound power. In retrospect, the exploding light bulb in the shower and Billy's tumble from his skateboard start to make sense.

Nervous but honoring Sue's request, Tommy arrives at Carrie's front door and asks her to Prom. Wary, she repeatedly refuses, until Margaret calls her in for dinner. Worried that her mother will find her with Tommy, Carrie hurriedly accepts the offer to be his date. As he leaves, she calls out a joyous "thank you" as it begins to rain. While the storm outside intensifies, Carrie excitedly tells Margaret of her Prom invitation, triggering Margaret's own tortured reverie ("I Remember How Those Boys Could Dance"). When she orders Carrie to tell Tommy that she can't go, they battle and, as rain starts to blow in, Margaret walks away to close the windows. "I'll get them!" Carrie shouts and uses her mind to slam them shut. Horrified by this display of power that she's certain is the work of the devil, Margaret cowers in fear as Carrie calmly finishes her dessert.

Act II

Preparations for Prom and the news that Tommy's taking Carrie preoccupy everyone at school, including Chris and Billy, who sneak into the gymnasium with a bucket of pig's blood and set their own nasty prank in place ("A Night We'll Never Forget"). Miss Gardner, suspicious of Sue's motives in having Tommy invite Carrie, warns them both that if they hurt Carrie in any way, they'll have to answer to her. Sue worries that Tommy is mad at her too, but insists he's merely disappointed, wanting to take his girlfriend to Prom. To make up for the event they're going to miss, he takes her into the half-decorated gym to share a private romantic moment ("You Shine").

It's finally Prom Night. The kids are electric with nervous excitement, and Carrie, no less anxious, resolves to make the most of the evening ("Why Not Me?"). Frantic with worry, Margaret tries to undermine Carrie's confidence ("Stay Here Instead"). Just then, Tommy arrives, and Carrie, looking ravishing in the gown she's made herself, departs with him. Alone, Margaret struggles with fundamentalist scriptures: "She must be sacrificed. Thou shalt not suffer a witch to live". Her duty – however horrific and tragic – is clear ("When There's No One").

At the gym, the psyched kids show off their Prom finery and pose for yearbook photos. Tommy enters with Carrie, and the crowd's reaction to her stunning transformation turns from initially hostile to unexpectedly welcoming ("Prom Arrival"). Miss Gardner, surprised and delighted by Carrie's new self-assurance, shares her own recollection of Prom, and teacher and student trade notes on this timeless high school ritual ("Unsuspecting Hearts – Reprise"). After much coaxing, Tommy leads a hesitant Carrie onto the dance floor where they're observed – first by Sue, who's felt compelled to sneak in and see how her plan has worked out, and then by Chris' partner-in-crime, Norma ("Dreamer in Disguise – Reprise"). Chris and Billy, hidden high in the rafters above, prepare to unleash their prank, as Sue comes upon Norma switching real Prom ballots for fake ones, arousing her suspicions ("Prom Climax").

Votes tabulated, Mr. Stephens and Miss Gardner announce Tommy and Carrie as Prom King and Queen. While the assembled salute them with the school song ("Alma Mater"), Sue spots the bucket dangling above the coronation area, confirming her worst suspicions. Frantic, she tries to warn Miss Gardner, but the teacher, who's been wary of Sue's motives in forgoing her Prom in favor of Carrie, pushes her out of the gym. Chris cues Billy, who yanks the bucket and drenches Carrie in blood. As the Prom-goers' stunned silence turns to derisive laughter, her unimaginable humiliation turns to fury – and then madness. Lashing out with her power, she exacts a terrible revenge on friend and foe alike, killing everyone present ("The Destruction"). Powerless, Sue watches her classmates perish. As emergency whistles sound and sirens wail, Sue follows the path of destruction that leads through the street to Carrie's house.

Carrie arrives home in her bloody prom dress and finds momentary solace in her mother's arms ("Carrie – Reprise"). Just as she's lulled into a sense of safety, Margaret – fulfilling what she believes to be her biblical duty – plunges a knife into her daughter. Wounded and trying to defend herself from further assault, Carrie uses her powers to stop her mother's heart. Sue stumbles into this horrific scene and, hearing Carrie's anguished cries, rushes to her side to comfort her, but she's too late. As Carrie dies in her arms, the figures from Sue's memory provide a final, haunting testimony of redemption ("Epilogue").

Musical numbers

Stratford-upon-Avon

 Act I
 Overture – Orchestra
 "In" – Miss Gardner and Girls
 "Dear Lord" – Carrie
 "Dream On" – Sue, Chris, Carrie, and Girls
 "Her Mother Should Have Told Her" – Miss Gardner, Sue
 "Carrie" – Carrie
 "Open Your Heart" – Margaret, Carrie
 "And Eve Was Weak" – Margaret, Carrie
 "Don't Waste the Moon" – Sue, Tommy, Chris, Billy, Boys and Girls
 "Evening Prayers" – Margaret and Carrie
 "Unsuspecting Hearts" – Miss Gardner and Carrie
 "Do Me a Favor" – Sue, Tommy, Chris, Billy, Boys and Girls
 "I Remember How Those Boys Could Dance" – Margaret, Carrie

 Act II
 "Crackerjack" – Chris, Billy, Boys
 "Dream On Reprise (The Prom)" – Girls
 "White Star" – Sue
 "I'm Not Alone" – Carrie
 "Carrie (Reprise)" – Margaret, Carrie
 "When There's No One" – Margaret
 "Wotta Night" – Boys and Girls
 "Unsuspecting Hearts" (Reprise) – Miss Gardner, Carrie
 "Heaven" – Miss Gardner, Sue, Tommy, Chris, Billy, Carrie, Margaret, Boys and Girls
 "Alma Mater" – Boys and Girls
 "The Destruction" – Carrie
 "Carrie (Finale)" – Margaret

Broadway

 Act I
 Overture – Orchestra
 "In" – Miss Gardner, Girls
 "Dear Lord" – Carrie
 "Dream On" – Sue, Chris, Carrie, Girls
 "Carrie" – Carrie
 "Open Your Heart" – Margaret, Carrie
 "And Eve Was Weak" – Margaret, Carrie
 "Don't Waste the Moon" – Sue, Tommy, Chris, Billy, Boys and Girls
 "Evening Prayers" – Carrie, Margaret
 "Unsuspecting Hearts" – Miss Gardner, Carrie
 "Do Me a Favor" – Sue, Tommy, Chris, Billy, Boys and Girls
 "I Remember How Those Boys Could Dance" – Carrie, Margaret

 Act II
 "Out for Blood" – Chris, Billy, Boys
 "It Hurts to Be Strong" – Sue
 "I'm Not Alone" – Carrie
 "Carrie (Reprise)" - Margaret, Carrie
 "When There's No One" – Margaret
 "Wotta Night!" – Boys and Girls
 "Unsuspecting Hearts (Reprise)" – Miss Gardner, Carrie
 "Heaven" – Tommy, Sue, Miss Gardner, Carrie, Margaret, Boys and Girls
 "Alma Mater" – Miss Gardner, Boys and Girls
 "The Destruction" – Carrie
 "Carrie (Reprise)" – Margaret

Off-Broadway revival

Act I
 "In" – Ensemble
 "Carrie" – Carrie White
 "Open Your Heart" – Reverend Bliss, Margaret, Carrie, Choir
 "And Eve Was Weak" – Margaret, Carrie
 "The World According to Chris" – Chris, Billy, Sue, Tommy, Kids
 "Evening Prayers" – Carrie, Margaret
 "Dreamer in Disguise" – Tommy
 "Once You See" – Sue
 "Unsuspecting Hearts" – Miss Gardner, Carrie
 "Do Me a Favor" – Sue, Chris, Tommy, Billy, Kids
 "I Remember How Those Boys Could Dance" – Carrie, Margaret

 Act II
 "A Night We'll Never Forget" – Carrie, Chris, Billy, Sue, Ensemble
 "You Shine" – Tommy, Sue
 "Why Not Me?" – Carrie, Kids
 "Stay Here Instead" – Margaret, Carrie
 "When There's No One" – Margaret
 "Prom Arrival" – Ensemble
 "Unsuspecting Hearts (Reprise)" – Carrie, Miss Gardner
 "Dreamer in Disguise (Reprise)" — Tommy, Carrie, Ensemble
 "Prom Climax" – Chris, Billy, Carrie, Tommy, Ensemble
 "Alma Mater" – Ensemble
 "The Destruction" – Carrie, Ensemble
 "Carrie (Reprise)" – Margaret
 "Epilogue" – Sue, Ensemble

Characters

Casts

Awards and nominations

Original Broadway production

2012 Off-Broadway revival

2015 Off-West End production

References
Notes

Bibliography
 Mandelbaum, Ken (1992). Not Since Carrie: Forty Years of Broadway Musical Flops, pp. 3–9. 347–356, St. Martin Press.

External links

 Official Los Angeles Production Website
 MCC Theater official website
 Official Vancouver Production Website
 
 New York Times review by Frank Rich, May 13, 1988
 New York Times article with history, May 8, 1988
  (archive)

1988 musicals
Broadway musicals
Teen musicals
Musicals based on films
Musicals based on novels
Stage shows based on works by Stephen King
Carrie (franchise)
Matricide in fiction